The 2012 season is the 117th year in the club's history, the 101st season in Clube de Regatas do Flamengo's football existence, and their 42nd in the Brazilian Série A, having never been relegated from the top division.

Club

First-team staff
Updated 25 July 2012.

Other information

First-team squad
As of 9 December 2012, according to combined sources on the official website.

Players with Dual Nationality
   Darío Bottinelli
   Thomas
   Marcos González
   Liédson

Flamengo Youth Team

Professional players able to play in the youth team

Youth players with first team experience

Out on loan

Transfers

In

Out

Statistics

Appearances and goals
Last updated on 9 December 2012.
 Players in italic have left the club during the season.

|}

Top scorers
Includes all competitive matches

Clean sheets
Includes all competitive matches

Disciplinary record

Overview

Competitions

Pre-season friendlies

Campeonato Carioca

Taça Guanabara

Matches

Semifinal

Taça Rio

Matches

Semifinal

Série A

Standings

Results summary

Pld=Matches played; W=Matches won; D=Matches drawn; L=Matches lost;

Results by round

Matches

Copa Libertadores

Copa Libertadores squad
As of 13 February 2012, according to combined sources on the official website.

In Conmebol competitions players must be assigned numbers between 1 and 25.

 (Replaced)

 (Replaced)

 (Replaced)

First stage

Second stage

The Second Stage, played in home-and-away round-robin format, began on 7 February and will end on 19 April. The top two teams from each group will advance to the Round of 16.

Group 2

Matches

Honors

Individuals

IFFHS ranking
Flamengo position on the Club World Ranking during the 2012 season, according to IFFHS.

Notes

References

External links
 Clube de Regatas do Flamengo
 Flamengo official website (in Portuguese)

Brazilian football clubs 2012 season
CR Flamengo seasons